Snake Island is a small, uninhabited, rocky island northeast of Nanaimo.  It is a minor member of the large group of islands east of southern Vancouver Island called the Gulf Islands. It is a bird sanctuary, and home to a colony of harbour seals.  The island is a frequent destination for local wildlife tours, and the rocky shores and reefs around the island are popular with divers.  Local seals have become accustomed to divers in the water, and will interact with them.

The vessel was acquired and prepared by the Artificial Reef Society of British Columbia.

External links
Artificial Reef Society of BC

Uninhabited islands of British Columbia
Regional District of Nanaimo